Mestiço is a Portuguese term that referred to persons born from a couple in which one was an aboriginal person and the other a European.

Mestiço community in Brazil

It literally translates as "mameluke", probably referring to the common Iberian comparisons of swarthy people to North Africans (cf.

In modern-day Brazil (most particularly in the south), nevertheless, this word became general slang for any boy, regardless of race.

Even before the use of the Portuguese language in public became mandatory for Brazilians, nevertheless, other categories of  appeared, with the introduction of African slavery by the Portuguese to Brazil and subsequent assimilation of them, whether enslaved, free or runaway, in both Portuguese settlements and Indigenous villages, as well as the Portuguese colonization of Africa and Asia.

The term was and is used to describe individuals born from any mixture of different ethnicities. Mainly these individuals usually have a blend in African, Native American, and European Caucasian. there are specific groups like - European/Portuguese and Native American parents are commonly known as caboclo or, more commonly in the past, mameluco. Individuals of European and African ancestry are described as mulato. Cafuzos (known as zambo in the English language) are the production of Native American and African ancestors. if someone has a mix of all three they are known as "pardo". Brazil celebrates The Mixed Race Day (Dia do Mestiço) (June 27 is an official date in States of Amazonas) to celebrate racial unity in the nation, Paraíba and Roraima. The Day of the Caboclo (Dia do Caboclo) occurs June 24.

Mestiço community in Angola
The Mestiço are primarily of mixed European, native born indigenous Angolan and/or other indigenous African lineages. They tend to be Portuguese culturally and to have full Portuguese names.

Although they make up about 2% of the population, they are the socially elite, and racially privileged, group in the country. Historically, Mestiços formed social and cultural allegiances with Portuguese colonists, subsequently identifying with the Portuguese over and above their indigenous identities. Despite their loyalty, the ethnic group faced economic and political adversity at hands of the white population during times of economic hardship for whites. These actions lead to ostracizing Mestiços from their inherited economic benefits which sparked the group to take a new sociopolitical direction. However, since the 400 year Portuguese presence in the country, the ethnic group has retained their position of entitlement which is highly evident in the political, economic and cultural hierarchy in present-day Angola. Their phenotype range is broad with a number of members possessing physical characteristics that are close to others within the indigenous black non-mixed population. Since the Mestiços are generally better educated than the rest of the indigenous black population, they exercise influence in government disproportionate to their numbers.

Mestiço communities in Guinea-Bissau and Cape Verde
In Guinea-Bissau, 1% of the population is of mixed African Native and Portuguese descent. 

In Cape Verde, 69% of population is of mestiço descent.Patricia Ferraz de Matos The Colours of the Empire: Racialized Representations  0857457632  2013 p.120 "If a White father did not recognize a Mestiço child as his own, the child would be treated as Black, a bastard who belonged neither to the world of White ... The term Mestiço designated an individual of mixed European and Asian descent."

Mestiço community of Mozambique
A minority of the population of Mozambique are of mixed Bantu and Portuguese heritage.

Mestiço community in São Tomé and Príncipe
Mestiços of São Tomé and Príncipe are descendants of Portuguese colonists and African slaves brought to Portuguese São Tomé and Príncipe islands during the early years of settlement from modern Benin, Gabon, the Republic of the Congo, the Democratic Republic of the Congo, and Angola (these people also are known as filhos da terra or "children of the land").

Mestiço communities in Portuguese India and Portuguese Ceylon
In Portugal's colonies in India from the seventeenth century, the term "castiço" came to be applied used for Portuguese persons born in India without any racial mixing, while "mestiço" applied to anyone with any European ancestor, however remote. The mestiço children of wealthy Portuguese men were often sent to Portugal to study. Sometimes they remained there and established families. Many Portuguese-born mestiços became prominent politicians, lawyers, writers or celebrities. Alfredo Nobre da Costa, who was briefly Prime Minister of Portugal in 1978, was of  Goan descent on his father's side. Similarly, António Costa, the Prime Minister of Portugal since  26 November 2015, is 1/4 Goan through his father, Orlando da Costa. Television presenter Catarina Furtado is also part Indian. In Portuguese Ceylon (Sri Lanka), the names Mestiços (Portuguese for "Mixed People") or Casados ("Married") were applied to people of mixed Portuguese and Sri Lankan (Sinhalese and Tamil) descent, starting in the 16th century. The locals who converted to Christianity but did not have any European blood were called, "indiacatos".

Mestiço communities in Portuguese Macau, Portuguese Malacca, and Portuguese Timor

See alsoLusotropicalismoLuso-AfricansLançados''
Indo-Portuguese
Luso-Indians
Luso-Asians

References

External links
http://www.iht.com/articles/2006/11/13/news/brazil.php

Multiracial affairs in Africa
Multiracial affairs in Asia
Multiracial affairs in Brazil
Ethnic groups in Brazil
Latin American caste system
Ethnonyms
Portuguese words and phrases
Mulatto